Magnus of Füssen
Magnoald Ziegelbauer